

External links 

Lists of 2012 term United States Supreme Court opinions